St. Peter the Martyr Parish Church is a Roman Catholic church located in Sual, Pangasinan, Philippines. The church was reconstructed twice, during mid-1880s and 1891, in the Spanish Colonial Revival architectural style. For the third time, it was rebuilt again and was destroyed during the 1945 Liberation of Manila.

History
Father Gabriel Perez began the construction of the first church and convent. The convent was later completed by Father Juan Gutierrez while the church by Father Pedro Villanova in 1870. A second church was constructed under the term of Father Felix Casas in 1883. The construction was suspended by the presiding bishop in 1891. The second church was completed by Father Eugenio Minguez in 1891  and was consecrated on June 8, 1893.

Architectural features
The church resembles post-Baroque or the Spanish Colonial Revival architectural style apart from some of the components of the facade. The low entablature does not fit the classical proportions of the Renaissance style. The columns of the first and second levels provide an element of irregular rhythm, as well as the bell tower on the left side.

References

External links

Roman Catholic churches in Pangasinan
Churches in the Roman Catholic Diocese of Alaminos